Janick Kamber (born 26 February 1992) is a Swiss professional footballer who plays for amateur club FC Mümliswil.

Club career
Kamber began his playing career at FC Basel and rose through the youth ranks, soon playing regularly for Basel's reserve team, but he did not make it to their first team. On 21 June 2011, he joined FC Lausanne-Sport on a two-year deal.  He made his debut on 20 July 2011 in a 2-0 away defeat against Grasshopper Club in the first game of the 2011–12 Swiss Super League season. He scored his first Swiss Super League goal in a 3–1 away win against BSC Young Boys on 9 April 2011.  Kamber left Lausanne-Sport at the end of the 2012–13 Swiss Super League after his contract was not renewed.

International career
Kamber is currently a Switzerland youth international. In 2009, he was part of the Swiss under-17 team that won the 2009 FIFA U-17 World Cup beating host team Nigeria 1—0 in the final. Kamber played in 6 of the 7 matches at the tournament and captained the side during their semi-final win against Colombia.

Honours

Switzerland
FIFA U-17 World Cup: 2009

References

External links

1992 births
Living people
Swiss men's footballers
Association football defenders
Association football midfielders
FC Lausanne-Sport players
FC Biel-Bienne players
FC Wohlen players
Neuchâtel Xamax FCS players
Swiss Super League players
Swiss Challenge League players
Switzerland youth international footballers